William Henry Spanswick (July 8, 1938 – December 2, 2020) was an American professional baseball player. A left-handed pitcher, Spanswick appeared in 29 games, seven as a starter, in the Major Leagues for the 1964 Boston Red Sox.

Spanswick was born in Springfield, Massachusetts. He signed with the Red Sox in 1958 and spent six years working his way through the Boston farm system when he made the 1964 club out of spring training. He stayed on the Red Sox roster for the entire campaign. His two MLB victories came May 8 as a starter against the Washington Senators and June 28 in relief against the Cleveland Indians, with bullpen ace Dick Radatz getting saves in each game.

Spanswick pitched exclusively in relief after June 19, 1964.  In 65 innings pitched, he allowed 75 hits and 44 bases on balls, with 55 strikeouts.  The 1964 Red Sox finished eighth in the ten-team American League, with a 72–90 (.444) record.

He returned to the minor leagues in 1965 and retired after the 1968 season.

Spanswick was elected as a member of the inaugural class of the Enfield Athletic Hall of Fame in 1996.

He died December 2, 2020, at age 82.

References

External links

1938 births
2020 deaths
Allentown Red Sox players
Baseball players from Connecticut
Baseball players from Springfield, Massachusetts
Boston Red Sox players
Hawaii Islanders players
Holy Cross Crusaders baseball players
Johnstown Red Sox players
Major League Baseball pitchers
People from Enfield, Connecticut
Raleigh Capitals players
San Diego Padres (minor league) players
Seattle Angels players
Seattle Rainiers players
Toronto Maple Leafs (International League) players
Waterloo Hawks (baseball) players
Lexington Red Sox players